A hot toddy, also known as hot whiskey in Ireland, is typically a mixed drink made of liquor and water with honey, (or in some recipes, sugar), lemon, herbs (such as tea) and spices, and served hot.  Recipes vary, and hot toddy is traditionally drunk before retiring for the night, in wet or cold weather or to relieve the symptoms of the cold and flu. In How to Drink, Victoria Moore describes the drink as "the vitamin C for health, the honey to soothe, the alcohol to numb."

Preparation
A hot toddy is a mixture of a spirit (usually whisky), hot water, and honey (or, in some recipes, sugar).  In Canada, maple syrup may be used.  Additional ingredients such as cloves, a lemon slice or cinnamon (in stick or ground form) are often also added.

Etymology
The word toddy comes from the toddy drink in India, produced by fermenting the sap of palm trees. Its earliest known use to mean "a beverage made of alcoholic liquor with hot water, sugar, and spices" is from 1786. It is often referred to as a 'Hot Toady' However, a few other sources credit Robert Bentley Todd for his prescription of a hot drink of brandy, canella (white cinnamon), sugar syrup, and water.

Variations
A cold toddy is made with rye whiskey, oranges, lemons, cinnamon sticks, ginger, Earl Grey tea, cloves, honey, and orange or regular bitters.  It is served with ice and stirred until it is very cold.

See also 

 Mahogany (drink)
 Grog is the name of a similar drink based on rum in several cultures.
 Posset
 Absinthe
 List of hot beverages
 Tamagozake, the traditional Japanese cold cure, uses heated sake mixed with egg.

References

Mixed drinks
Hot drinks